The Walpole collection was a collection of paintings and other works of art at Houghton Hall in Norfolk and at other residences of Sir Robert Walpole. Many of the important works were sold in 1779 to Catherine the Great of Russia, and the Hermitage Museum still owns more than 120 works from the collection.

Origin
The collection was put together by Sir Robert Walpole, Britain's first prime minister, and housed at Houghton Hall and his other residences.
It included paintings by Van Dyck, Poussin, Rubens, and Rembrandt, as well as a number of portraits of family members. Many of the portraits and some of the other paintings came from the collection of the Wharton family which Walpole reputedly bought for £1500. These included royal portraits and family portraits by Lely and van Dyck (such as the double portrait of Philadelphia and Elisabeth Wharton). Walpole bought the complete collection, most of which went to Houghton, but a few of which were sold. Walpole's sons were active in obtaining works for his collection. He also received gifts from friends and from those seeking support or honours.

Walpole's collection of marble Roman busts was also noteworthy and the collection included a pair of silver wine coolers by William Lukin that are now in the Metropolitan Museum of Art, New York.

Horace Walpole, son of Sir Robert, published a catalogue of the collection in 1736.

The collection after Walpole's death
Following the death of Robert Walpole, the 2nd Earl of Orford, in 1751, "a lesser part of the collection" was sold at auction by the 3rd Earl.

In 1777, John Wilkes tried (but failed) to persuade parliament to buy the collection for the nation. Many of the Old Master paintings subsequently went to the Hermitage Museum having been sold by the 3rd Earl to Catherine the Great in 1779 for £40,550.

In total 206 works travelled from Houghton to the Hermitage. Many of these remain in the Hermitage, but some subsequently passed to other Russian museums. Some items from the collection were sold in 1853, including a portrait of Joseph Carreras by Sir Godfrey Kneller which returned to Houghton Hall. Further sales took place in the 1930s. During the 2nd World War, the collection was stored for protection in Sverdlovsk. The collection returned to the Hermitage in 1946 and it still owns 127 works from the collection.

Some works remained at Houghton after the sale to Catherine including Thomas Gainsborough's oil painting of his own family -- Thomas Gainsborough, with His Wife and Elder Daughter, Mary (circa 1751–1752).

From 17 May 2013, until 24 November 2013, 70 pictures from the Hermitage and other museums that were part of the collection were loaned to Houghton Hall to be exhibited in their original settings.

Some pictures from the collection

References

Further reading
 Campbell, Kristin. "Pictures for the Nation: Conceptualizing a Collection of 'Old Masters' for London, 1775-1800" (PhD Dissertation, Queen's University, 2009), pp 48–107. online
 Coutu, Joan Michèle. Then and Now: Collecting and Classicism in Eighteenth-century England (McGill-Queen's Press-MQUP, 2015).
 Moore, Andrew. Houghton Hall: The prime minister, the empress and the heritage (Philip Wilson Publishers, 1996).
 Moore, Andrew W., and Larisa Aleksandrovna Dukelʹskai︠a︡, eds. A Capital Collection: Houghton Hall and the Hermitage: with a Modern Edition of" Aedes Walpolianae", Horace Walpole's Catalogue of Sir Robert Walpole's Collection (Yale U.P. for the State Hermitage Museum and the Paul Mellon Centre for Studies in British Art, 2002).

Collection of the Hermitage Museum
Private art collections
Former private collections in the United Kingdom
Art collections in the United Kingdom